Kakira Sugar Works Limited, often called Kakira Sugar Works, is a leading sugar manufacturer in Uganda, the third-largest economy in the East African Community.

Location
The main factories of the company are located in the town of Kakira, in Jinja District, Eastern Uganda. The coordinates of the main factory are:0°30'36.0"N, 33°17'24.0"E (Latitude:0.5100; Longitude:33.2900). In addition to the factories in Kakira, the company maintains a corporate office along 5th Street, in Bugoloobi, in Kampala Industrial Area, and offices and warehouses, in Kakira, Jinja and Kampala.

Overview
Kakira Sugar Works is the largest manufacturer of sugar in Uganda, producing an estimated 165,000 metric tonnes of sugar annually, accounting for about 47% of the national output in 2011.

Kinyara Sugar Works in Jinja District is Uganda's second-largest sugar manufacturer, accounting for about 31% of annual national output. Sugar Corporation of Uganda Limited (SCOUL), in Buikwe District, accounts for about 17% of national production. The remaining 5% (about 15,000 metric tonnes annually), is produced by Sango Bay Estates Limited, in Sango Bay, Rakai District.(See Annual Production & Market Share Among Uganda's Sugar Manufacturers)

The sugar produced by the companies is marketed to the Eastern African countries of South Sudan, Democratic Republic of the Congo, Burundi, Rwanda, Tanzania, Kenya and Uganda. Kakira Sugar Works is the flagship business of the Madhvani Group of Companies, the largest conglomerate in Uganda, accounting for over 10% of the gross domestic product (GDP) of Uganda in 2010. Kakira Sugar Works possesses its own social infrastructure : free schools for employees' children, roads, hospitals, staff housing...

History
In 1920, the Vithaldas Haridas & Company, under the management of Muljibhai Madhvani, a twenty-six-year-old Indian-born Ugandan businessman, entrepreneur, industrialist and philanthropist, purchased  of land, in Kakira, between Jinja and Iganga, for the purpose of starting a sugar factory. Muljibhai later became the managing director of Vithaldas Haridas & Company. That sugar complex, later renamed Kakira Sugar Works, opened in 1930. The sugar manufacturing complex at Kakira employs over 7,500 people, according to the company website.

In 1987, Kakira Sugar Works went through a $59.38 million rehabilitation program funded by the World Bank and the African Development Bank. In 2000, the Madhvani group acquired 100% of Kakira Sugar Works' shares.

Ownership
Kakira Sugar Works is a (100%) subsidiary of the Madhvani Group, based in Kakira, Uganda. The Group's shareholding is private and is not widely, publicly known.

Expansion and upgrade
, Kakira Sugar Works Limited had gone through a USh 191 billion (about US$75 million) factory expansion and upgrade. USh 76.5 billion (about US$30 million), was raised through a 10-year corporate bond on the Uganda Securities Exchange, and the remainder was sourced from local banks. This upgrade boosted the factory's sugarcane crushing capacity to 7,500 tonnes per day. The co-generation capacity of Kakira Power Station, was also increased from 22 Megawatts to 52 Megawatts.

Ethanol production
In November 2016, Kakira Sugar Works started production of industrial-grade ethanol, distilled from molasses, produced as a by-product of sugar manufacturing. The ethanol distillery, was constructed by Praj Industries of India, at a cost of USh 133 billion (US$36.6 million). The distillery is expected to process the 74,000 metric tonnes of molasses that the sugar mill produces annually, into  of "fuel grade anhydrous ethanol".

See also

References

External links

 Web                site of Kakira Sugar Works
 Profile of Muljibhai Madhvani At Newvision.co.ug
  Uganda's Total Annual Sugar Production To Hit 350,000 Metric Tonnes In 2011
  Website of Uganda Sugar Cane Technologists’ Association (USCTA)
  Madhvani Group In US$30 Million Bond On The USE

Jinja District
Eastern Region, Uganda
Sugar companies of Uganda
Food and drink companies established in 1930
1930 establishments in Uganda
Madhvani Group
Agriculture in Uganda